Bergeria is a genus of moths in the family Erebidae erected by Kiriakoff in 1952.

Species
 Bergeria bourgognei Kiriakoff, 1952
 Bergeria haematochrysa Kiriakoff, 1952
 Bergeria octava Kiriakoff, 1961
 Bergeria ornata Kiriakoff, 1959
 Bergeria schoutedeni Kiriakoff, 1952
 Bergeria tamsi Kiriakoff, 1952

References

Syntomini
Moth genera